Jeffrey Ngai Tsun-sang (Chinese: 魏浚笙; born 23 April 1998), is a Hong Kong fashion model, actor and singer. He is known for appearing on ViuTV's Variety Show ,  and Drama . He released his first solo song "The First Fan" (第一個迷) on 1 January 2023 and got #1 on YouTube HK Trending.

Discography

Single 
 "The First Fan" (第一個迷)" (2023)

Filmography

Movie

Drama

Variety Show

MV Appearance (Actor)

MV Appearance (Group Member)

References

External links

Jeffrey Ngai's Official Youtube
Jeffrey Ngai's Facebook

1998 births
Living people
Cantopop singers
Hong Kong male singers
21st-century Hong Kong male singers
Hong Kong male film actors
Hong Kong television personalities
Hong Kong male television actors
Hong Kong idols